Jordan Greenway (born February 16, 1997) is an American professional ice hockey forward for the Buffalo Sabres of the National Hockey League (NHL). He was selected by the Minnesota Wild in the second round (50th overall) in the 2015 NHL Entry Draft.

Internationally, Greenway has represented the United States at the 2017 IIHF World Championship and 2018 Winter Olympics, becoming the first African-American named to a US Olympic ice hockey roster.

Playing career
Greenway began playing hockey in the Canton, New York minor hockey association before going to play high school hockey in Minnesota at Shattuck-Saint Mary's before joining the USA Hockey National Team Development Program (U.S. NTDP). As a member of the U.S. NTDP, he played the 2013–14 and 2014–15 seasons in the United States Hockey League (USHL). Greenway's outstanding play was rewarded when he was invited to skate in the 2014 CCM/USA Hockey All-American Prospects Game.

After his selection by the Wild in the NHL Entry Draft, Greenway played his freshman season for the Boston University Terriers in the 2015–16 season. In his Junior year, Greenway was selected to the Hockey East Third All-Star Team after reaching the 30-point mark for the second season. Greenway was also named to the Hockey East All-Tournament Team after the 2018 Hockey East Men's Ice Hockey Tournament along with teammates Jake Oettinger and Chad Krys. On March 26, 2018, he signed a three-year entry level contract with the Minnesota Wild. Greenway made his NHL debut the following day in a 2–1 loss to the Nashville Predators. Greenway played his first career NHL playoff game in Game 1 of the 2018 Stanley Cup playoffs against the Winnipeg Jets. By doing so, Greenway became the first player to play in the Olympic Games, an NCAA tournament, and the Stanley Cup playoffs within the same season. Greenway scored his first career NHL goal in the playoffs, in a 6–2 win over the Winnipeg Jets on April 15.

Greenway began the 2018–19 season in the NHL but was reassigned to the American Hockey League after nine games to further his development. The day following his demotion, Greenway recorded a hat trick in a 6–1 win over the Colorado Eagles. Following his second AHL game, Greenway was recalled back to the NHL. On October 29, in his first NHL game following his recall, Greenway scored his first regular season goal in a 5–2 loss to the Vancouver Canucks.

On January 31, 2022, the Wild signed Greenway to a three-year, $9 million contract extension.

In the  season, Greenway was in the midst of his worst statistical year, registering only 2 goals and 7 points through 45 regular season games, before he was dealt at the NHL trade deadline by the Wild to the Buffalo Sabres in exchange for two draft picks on March 3, 2023.

International play

Greenway first represented the United States in helping capture a gold medal at the 2014 World U-17 Hockey Challenge. He also won a gold medal as a member of Team USA at the 2015 IIHF World U18 Championships.

At the conclusion of his sophomore season with the Terriers, Greenway was named to the senior United States team for the 2017 IIHF World Championship in Germany and France.

On January 1, 2018, Greenway was selected to compete at the 2018 Winter Olympics, becoming the first African-American named to a US Olympic hockey roster.

Personal life
His brother, James, was drafted 72nd overall by the Toronto Maple Leafs in the 2016 NHL Entry Draft.

Career statistics

Regular season and playoffs

International

Awards and honors

References

External links
 

1997 births
Living people
21st-century African-American sportspeople
African-American ice hockey players
American men's ice hockey left wingers
Boston University Terriers men's ice hockey players
Buffalo Sabres players
Ice hockey players at the 2018 Winter Olympics
Ice hockey players from New York (state)
Iowa Wild players
Minnesota Wild draft picks
Minnesota Wild players
Olympic ice hockey players of the United States
People from Canton, New York
USA Hockey National Team Development Program players